Elevator is a 1979 rock album by the Bay City Rollers. Having replaced longtime lead singer Les McKeown with Duncan Faure, the group shortened their name to simply The Rollers, and pursued a more rocking, power-pop sound than their previous work.

The album, released by Arista, was critically acclaimed but poorly received commercially. Neither the album itself or any single releases would hit the charts.

The album was reissued on CD in 2008, with no bonus cuts however.

Music
Dave Thompson of AllMusic wrote that the album featured a hard rock, AOR direction. Billboard felt the music was reminiscent of 1965-66 era Beatles, with Trouser Press even comparing the album to the Beatles' Rubber Soul (1965).

Critical reception

AllMusic gave the album four stars out of five.

Track listing

Side One
"Stoned Houses #1" (Faulkner, Wood, Faure)
"Elevator" (Faulkner, Faure, Wood)
"Playing in a Rock and Roll Band" (Faure, Tom Seufurt)
"Hello & Welcome Home" (Faulkner, Faure)
"I Was Eleven" (Faure)
"Stoned Houses #2" (Faulkner)

Side Two
"Turn on the Radio" (Faulkner, Faure, Wood, Alan Longmuir)
"Instant Relay" (Faulkner)
"Tomorrow's Just a Day Away" (Faulkner, Wood)
"Who'll Be My Keeper" (Faure)
"Back on the Road Again" (Faulkner, Faure, Wood, Alan Longmuir)
"Washington's Birthday" (Wood, Faulkner, Faure)

Personnel

Group members
Eric Faulkner – Guitar, acoustic guitar, vocals, lead vocal on "Playing in a Rock & Roll Band"
Duncan Faure – Lead vocals, piano, moog, guitars
Alan Longmuir – Guitar, bass, vocals, string machine
Derek Longmuir – Drums, percussion
Stuart "Woody" Wood – Bass, piano, moog, string machine, clavinet, vocals, lead vocal on "Tomorrow's Just A Day Away"

Other personnel
Peter Ker – producer
Rod Thear – engineer
Gary Gray – mixing engineer
John Naslen – mixing engineer

References

Bay City Rollers albums
1979 albums
Arista Records albums